John Ezirim (died 13 December 2008) was the pioneer Anglican Bishop of Aba Ngwa North in Aba Province  of the Church of Nigeria.

Ezirim was enthroned as first Bishop of Aba Ngwa North in April 2007. He died on 13 December 2008 and was replaced by Nathan Kanu.

References 

2008 deaths
Anglican bishops of Aba Ngwa North
21st-century Anglican bishops in Nigeria
Nigerian Anglicans